Princess Bathildis of Schaumburg-Lippe (21 May 18736 April 1962) was daughter of Prince William of Schaumburg-Lippe, and consort of Friedrich, Prince of Waldeck and Pyrmont.

Early life
Bathildis was born at Ratibořice, Kingdom of Bohemia (now Czech Republic), the sixth child and second daughter of Prince William of Schaumburg-Lippe (1834–1906), (son of George William, Prince of Schaumburg-Lippe and Princess Ida of Waldeck and Pyrmont) and his wife, Princess Bathildis of Anhalt-Dessau (1837–1902), (daughter of Prince Frederick Augustus of Anhalt-Dessau and Princess Marie Luise Charlotte of Hesse-Kassel).

Marriage
Bathildis married on 9 August 1895 in Náchod, her second cousin, Friedrich, Prince of Waldeck and Pyrmont (1865–1946), sixth child and elder son of George Victor, Prince of Waldeck and Pyrmont and his first wife, Princess Helena of Nassau.

They had four children:
Josias, Hereditary Prince of Waldeck and Pyrmont (13 May 1896 – 30 November 1967)
Prince Maximilian William Gustav Herman of Waldeck and Pyrmont (13 September 1898 – 23 February 1981). Married Gustava, Countess of Hallermund (b. 7 December 1899, Segeberg, Germany - d. 27 October 1986) on 12 September 1929. They have four children:
Marie Luise Bathildis Elfrida Olga, Princess of Waldeck and Pyrmont (b. 3 November 1930). Married Albrecht-Karl III, Prince of Castell-Castell (b. 13 August 1925 - d. 9 May 2016) on 23 May 1951. They have eight children:
Philippa Emma, Countess of Castell-Castell (b. 23 January 1952). Married Michael Alfred Wolfgang Dietrich Hendrik Antonius Maria, Prince of Salm-Salm (b. 16 January 1953) on 27 May 1977. They have six children:
Christina, Princess of Salm-Salm (b. 9 June 1978). Married Raphael, Count of Hoensbroech (b. 21 April 1977, Tokyo, Japan) on 12 October 2002. They have five children:
Gabriel, Countess of Hoensbroech (b. 1 July 2004, Munich, Germany)
Florentin, Count of Hoensbroech (b. 15 November 2005, Munich, Germany)
Jacobus, Count of Hoensbroech (b. 6 Oct 2007)
Balthasar, Count of Hoensbroech (b. 10 Nov 2009)
Helena, Countess of Hoensbroech (b. 2014)
Constantin, Prince of Salm-Salm (b. 9 June 1980). Married Friederike Stephanie Gumberz Edle of Rhonthal (b. 3 November 1983) on 3 December 2005. They have four children:
Carlotta, Princess of Salm-Salm (b. 23 June 2009)
Casper, Prince of Salm-Salm (b. 24 September 2010)
Casimir, Prince of Salm-Salm (b. 10 Nov 2012)
Mathilda, Princess of Salm-Salm (b. 14 Nov 2015)
Marie-Anna, Princess of Salm-Salm (b. 22 February 1986). Married Dominik, Count of Neipperg (b. 27 July 1981) on 4 August 2012. He is the grandson of Otto and Regina von Habsburg. They have two children:
Florentina, Countess of Neipperg (b. 4 March 2015)
Xenia, Countess of Neipperg (b. 2016)
Antonia, Princess of Salm-Salm (b. 5 December 1987)
Cecily, Princess of Salm-Salm (b. 4 December 1989); married Ludwig Benecke on 7 July 2012. 
Johanna Bathildis, Countess of Castell-Castell (b. 23 January 1952). Married Johannes, Prince of Lobkowicz (b. 22 August 1954) on 2 September 1977. They have five children:
Nikolaus, Prince of Lobkowicz (b. 25 September 1978)
Marie-Sophia, Princess of Lobkowicz (b. 6 January 1980)
Maximilian, Prince of Lobkowicz (b. 4 January 1982)
Maria Lioba, Princess of Lobkowicz (b. 23 September 1985, Munich, Germany). Married Christian Schneider (b. 9 October 1978, Kelheim, Germany) on 30 September 2007. They have one daughter:
Philomena Schneider (b. March 2008)
Wenzel, Prince of Lobkowicz (b. 4 December 1986)
Princess Helena of Waldeck and Pyrmont (22 December 1899 – 18 February 1948)
Prince Georg Wilhelm Karl Victor of Waldeck and Pyrmont (10 March 1902 – 14 November 1971)

Ancestry

Notes and sources

The Royal House of Stuart, London, 1969, 1971, 1976, Addington, A. C., Reference: 28

|-

1873 births
1962 deaths
People from Česká Skalice
People from the Kingdom of Bohemia
German Bohemian people
House of Lippe
Princesses of Schaumburg-Lippe
House of Waldeck and Pyrmont
Princesses of Waldeck and Pyrmont